"Kitty Can" is a song by the Bee Gees, composed by Barry, Robin & Maurice Gibb. It was released as the B-side of "I've Gotta Get a Message to You" in July 1968, and as the second track on the album Idea in September 1968. In 1973, RSO Records released a compilation called Kitty Can only in Argentina and Uruguay, and this song appeared as the first track on that album.

Background

Barry Gibb told Andrew Sandoval: "'Kitty Can' was written by Maurice and I, during a night with Maurice and Lulu at their place in London, the early apartment they shared before they moved to Hampstead".

The Bee Gees began work on "Kitty Can" at IBC Studios on 12 June 1968, along with three other songs – "I.O.I.O.", "Let There Be Love" and the unreleased track "No Name". This was their first session using the studio's newly installed eight-track recording equipment.

Joseph Brennan writes: "The eight-track equipment was built in the USA for standard American voltage, so IBC had to supply power to it through an intermediate device that proved somewhat unstable. The mono and stereo mixes ended up at more or less different speeds...." As a result, the mono version of "Kitty Can" runs significantly faster than the stereo version.

The Studio Albums 1967-1968 includes both the mono and stereo mixes, as well as an alternative stereo version with orchestration by Bill Shepherd. A demo version of the song, which has not been officially released, is reportedly similar to the final version but has "some additional ad-libbed almost jazz scat backing vocals" (probably by Maurice). Maurice's higher vocal is more prevalent on this version.

A promotional film for the song was produced which was later discovered and broadcast by the Oldies music channel 192TV.

Track listing

Personnel
 Barry Gibb — Lead and harmony vocal, guitar
 Maurice Gibb — Lead and harmony vocal, bass
 Vince Melouney — guitar
 Colin Petersen — drums

References

1968 songs
Bee Gees songs
Songs written by Barry Gibb
Songs written by Robin Gibb
Songs written by Maurice Gibb
Song recordings produced by Robert Stigwood
Song recordings produced by Barry Gibb
Song recordings produced by Robin Gibb
Song recordings produced by Maurice Gibb